Sandesam is a 1991 Indian Malayalam-language political satire black comedy film directed by Sathyan Anthikad and written by Sreenivasan starring Thilakan, Sreenivasan, Jayaram, Oduvil Unnikrishnan, Siddique, Kaviyoor Ponnamma and Maathu. The film deals with political activism existing in Kerala and takes major digs on the political parties in the state.In the film, Raghavan, a retired railway employee, wishes to live the rest of his life with his family. However, he is forced to become a mediator and reconcile his two sons who feud over petty politics.

A commercial success upon release, Sandesam is often regarded as a classic in Malayalam cinema. The film was included in IBN Live's list of "100 Greatest Indian Films of All Time". The film was remade in Tamil language as Veettai Paar Naattai Paar by director Thulasidas in 1994.

Plot 
After retirement from Indian Railways as station master, Raghavan Nair (Thilakan) is back home. His long cherished dream to spend his retirement with his family consisting of his wife (Kaviyoor Ponnamma), three sons and two daughters gets a blow after witnessing his two sons brawling with each other over their political differences and the debilitating effect this has on the family. Prabhakaran (Sreenivasan), the elder one is a staunch leftist and an active worker of the Revolutionary Democratic Party (RDP), which has just lost the Kerala state Assembly elections and relinquished office. Prakashan (Jayaram), popularly known as KRP, Prabhakaran's younger brother is involved with the Indian National Secular Party (INSP) which has now come to power. Though they are both educated, neither has any plans to earn a living on their own and are fully immersed in petty politics, sponging off their parents for their needs.

Raghavan Nair becomes deeply worried about their future, and tries to advise his sons, but his admonitions fall on deaf ears. Aanandan (Mala Aravindan), his son-in-law is a police sub-inspector, but on suspension. When RDP was in power, he had arrested and beaten up several of the opposition party workers on instruction from the ruling party officials. Now that the former opposition is in power, they exact their revenge; first by transferring him repeatedly to stations as remote as possible and then by suspending him.

As part of his retired life, Raghavan Nair decides to focus his attention on his agricultural activities and meets the new young agricultural officer Udayabhanu (Siddique) and with his wife's approval, wants their younger daughter Latika to marry him. But his elder sons oppose it for flimsy and petty reasons. Prakashan pulls some strings and gets him transferred immediately to a remote location in order to prevent the marriage, but Nair gets them married at the registrar's office.

In the meantime, Aanandan and his wife Lata (Raghavan Nair's oldest daughter) demand partition of the property and their share of the inheritance which Raghavan Nair objects to. The last straw is when their mother falls ill and is hospitalized and none of her children, especially the two older sons, show up at the hospital. Raghavan upon seeing all of them milling around his house on returning from the hospital, loses his temper. He kicks out all his children and orders them to never enter his house again. But to his surprise, he finds both Prakashan and Prabhakaran at the gate, fully repenting after Achu informs him. He calls them in and they begin a new life. Some time later we see Prabhakaran who has started work as a lawyer and Prakashan going for a job interview as part of his efforts to change and gain employment. At the same time, it is also seen that Prasanthan, the school-going youngest son of Raghavan Nair, has decided to form a student political organisation to conduct a protest at his school. But both his brothers having learnt their lesson the hard way, scold him and break the flag and banners he made. The movie ends here with the message clearly being delivered.

Cast 

Thilakan as Raghavan Nair (Retd. Station Master - Indian Railway), father of Prabhakaran, Prakashan, Latha, Lathika and Prashanthan
Sreenivasan as Prabhakaran Kottappalli  Kottappalli  Prabha, RDP member
Jayaram as Prakashan Kottappalli / KRP (Kottappalli Raghavan Nair Prakashan), INSP member
Oduvil Unnikrishnan as Achuthan Nair, friend of Raghavan Nair
Siddique as Udayabhanu (Lathika's husband and Raghavan Nair's son-in-law), an Honest Agricultural officer
Kaviyoor Ponnamma as Bhanumathi, wife of Raghavan Nair and mother of Prabhakaran, Prakasan, Latha, Lathika and Prashanthan
Maathu as Lathika, Raghavan Nair's younger daughter, Udayabhanu's wife
Mamukkoya as K.G. Pothuval, the local leader of INSP
Sankaradi as Kumara Pillai, the leftist ideologue
Mala Aravindan as SI Aanandan, Lata's Husband, Raghavan Nair's oldest son-in-law.
K. P. A. C. Lalitha as Lata. Anandan's wife and Raghavan Nair's oldest daughter
Innocent as Yashwant Sahai, the All-India President of INSP (Cameo)
Bobby Kottarakkara as Uthaman, RDP member
Biyon as S.I. Aanandan's Son
Ambili as S.I. Aanandan's Daughter
T. P. Madhavan as Police Inspector
Rahul Laxman as Prasanthan, Raghavan Nair's youngest son
James as an INSP member
Kalabhavan Haneef as INSP Worker
Salim Kumar (uncredited role)

Soundtrack
"Thumbappoo Kodiyuduthu" - K S Chitra, G. Venugopal, chorus

Legacy
Sandesam is considered one of the best satire movies in the film. Many of the dialogues still find their way into the daily conversation of Malayalees. The infamous pennukaanal scene and the Poland dialogue is still etched into the viewer's hearts.  In 2016, on the occasion of India celebrating its 70th Independence day, news agency NDTV compiled a list called "70 Years, 70 Great Films" and Sandesam was among the four Malayalam films that found place in the list. In 2013, in an online poll conducted by CNN-IBN on their website as part of the 100 years celebration of Indian cinema, Sandesam was included in the poll for finding the "greatest Indian film ever".

References

External links 
 
 Sandesam at the Malayalam Movie Database

1990s Malayalam-language films
Indian political satire films
Films scored by Johnson
1990s black comedy films
Films shot in Kozhikode
Films with screenplays by Sreenivasan
Films directed by Sathyan Anthikad
Malayalam films remade in other languages
1991 comedy films
1991 films